() is a municipality and village in Frýdek-Místek District in the Moravian-Silesian Region of the Czech Republic. It has about 500 inhabitants.

Polish minority makes up 23.4% of the population.

Etymology
The name is derived from Polish word bocian (meaning "stork"). The storks hunted frogs that lived abundantly in the wetlands that used to be here.

Geography
Bocanovice is situated in the historical region of Cieszyn Silesia. The western part of the municipality lies in the Moravian-Silesian Beskids, the eastern part lies in the Jablunkov Furrow lowland. The Lomná River forms the eastern municipal border.

History
The first written mention of Bocanovice is from 1597. It belonged then to the Duchy of Teschen. It was the princely court, where four families originally settled and cultivated the fields of the court and performed all farm work. The village was then settled by the Vlachs, who came with their flocks of sheep from Romania.

After Revolutions of 1848 in the Austrian Empire a modern municipal division was introduced in the re-established Austrian Silesia. The village as a municipality was subscribed to the political district of Cieszyn and the legal district of Jablunkov. According to the censuses conducted in 1880–1910 the population of the municipality grew from 282 in 1880 to 330 in 1910 with the majority being native Polish-speakers (between 96.6% and 99.1%) accompanied by few German-speaking (at most 9 or 3.1% in 1890) and Czech-speaking people (at most 2 or 0.6% in 1900). In terms of religion in 1910 the majority were Roman Catholics (80.3%), followed by Protestants (19.7%).

After World War I, Polish–Czechoslovak War and the division of Cieszyn Silesia in 1920, the municipality became a part of Czechoslovakia. Following the Munich Agreement, in October 1938 together with the Zaolzie region it was annexed by Poland, administratively adjoined to Cieszyn County of Silesian Voivodeship. It was then annexed by Nazi Germany at the beginning of World War II. After the war it was restored to Czechoslovakia.

From 1961 to 1990 Bocanovice was an administrative part of Jablunkov. Since 1990, it has been a separate municipality.

Transport
The Košice–Bohumín Railway goes through the municipality.

References

External links

 

Villages in Frýdek-Místek District
Cieszyn Silesia